Roominate is a construction set introduced by Maykah Inc., a company founded by Alice Brooks and Bettina Chen, in 2012. The product, marketed at girls aged 6–10, consists of modular plastic building pieces that can interlock to create models and includes circuits that can be wired. Originally funded through Kickstarter, the company received an investment from Mark Cuban and Lori Greiner during the sixth season of Shark Tank. In 2016, Roominate was acquired by toy manufacturer PlayMonster.

History
Alice Brooks and Bettina Chen, the founders of Maykah, Inc., met in the master's degree engineering program at Stanford University. The two launched their first prototype on Kickstarter and raised US$85,000 from a US$25,000 funding goal. The team participated in StartX, a business incubator for Stanford entrepreneurs, in 2012, and partnered with EdForward, the Center for Innovation in Education at the UC Davis School of Education, to create a series of educational activity guides to accompany the kits.

Roominate appeared on the Season 6 premiere episode of Shark Tank, where they received a US$500,000 investment from Mark Cuban and Lori Greiner for a 5% equity share.

Products
Roominate offers nine products that contain different quantities and combinations of the modular building pieces and circuitry. Tekla Perry, in an article for the Institute of Electrical and Electronics Engineers, described Roominate as a "STEM" (science, technology, engineering, and mathematics) toy company.

Jenn Choi of Forbes stated that the set's design "naturally invites other materials to enhance the play experience", which gave Roominate "even more play value". In a review of the product, Joshua Gans, also of Forbes, wrote that "it isn't likely to impress parents or kids", but afterwards wrote that the ability to use the motor for different purposes "[relieved] some of [his family's] initial disappointment". Jennifer Alsever of Inc. magazine included Roominate on a list of toys for "next-generation inventors".

References

External links

Construction toys
Kickstarter-funded products
Toy companies of the United States
Companies based in Sunnyvale, California
American companies established in 2012
Women in engineering
2016 mergers and acquisitions